The North Atlantic is the portion of the Atlantic Ocean which lies north of the Equator.

North Atlantic may also refer to:

North Atlantic Refining, an oil company based in Newfoundland and Labrador, Canada
North Atlantic Books, a publisher located in Berkeley, California

See also
North Atlantic Treaty Organization (NATO)